First Touch is a Singaporean English-language medical drama which aired in 2002 and 2003. The series is about a team of doctors, nurses and staff at a hospital obstetrics and gynaecology department.

Cast
Edmund Chen as Dr. Charles Yong, chief of gynaecology
Amy Cheng
Nick Shen as Dr. Wee Teck Meng
Ferlin Jayatissa as Dr. Vasso
Vernetta Lopez as Dr Kelly Chan
Wee Soon Hui

Supporting/Guest/Recurring Cast
Steph Song as Dr. Ann Lee
Natalie Faye as Lee Hoon
Timothy Nga as Steve Lai
Noor Naserimah as Nurse Faridah
Alan Tern
Mindee Ong
Joey Swee
Cheryl Chin

References

External links
First Touch on Mediacorp website

Singaporean medical television series
2000s Singaporean television series
2002 Singaporean television series debuts
Channel 5 (Singapore) original programming